Pakistan Railways  is the national, state-owned railway company of Pakistan. Founded in 1861 (under British India or Indian Railways) and headquartered in Lahore, it owns  of operational track across Pakistan, stretching from Torkham to Karachi, offering both freight and passenger services.

In 2014, the Ministry of Railways launched Pakistan Railways Vision 2026, which seeks to increase PR's share in Pakistan's transportation sector from 4% to 20%, using the  China–Pakistan Economic Corridor rail upgrade. The plan includes building new locomotives, development and improvement of current rail infrastructure, an increase in average train speed, improved on-time performance and expansion of passenger services. The first phase of the project was completed in 2017, and the second phase is scheduled for completion by 2021. Until October 2022, these projects have not started construction or tendering.

Pakistan Railways is an active member of the International Union of Railways. In the 2018/19 financial year, Pakistan Railways carried 70 million passengers.

History 

In 1855, during the British Raj, several railway companies began laying track and operating in Sindh and Punjab. The country's railway system was originally a patchwork of local rail lines operated by small, private companies, including the Scinde Railway, Punjab Railway, Delhi Railway and Indus Flotilla. In 1870, the four companies combined to form the Scinde, Punjab & Delhi Railway. Several other rail lines were soon built, including the Indus Valley State Railway, Punjab Northern State Railway, Sind–Sagar Railway, Sind–Pishin State Railway, Trans–Baluchistan Railway and Kandahar State Railway. These six companies merged with the Scinde, Punjab & Delhi Railway to form the North Western State Railway in 1880. Between 1880 and 1947, the North Western State Railway expanded throughout Punjab and Sindh.  Locomotives were standardised following a report from the Locomotive Committee on Standard Locomotives for Indian Railways, published in 1910.

Following independence in 1947, most of the North Western State Railway infrastructure was in Pakistani territory and was renamed the Pakistan Western Railway. In East Bengal, the portion of the Assam Bengal Railway in Pakistani territory was renamed the Pakistan Eastern Railway.

In 1954, a branch line was extended from the Karachi–Peshawar Railway Line to Mardan and Charsada. Two years later, the Jacobabad-Kashmore metre-gauge line was converted to  broad gauge. The Kot Adu-Kashmore section of the Kotri–Attock Railway Line was built from 1969 to 1973, providing an alternate route from Karachi to northern Pakistan. In 1974, Pakistan Western Railways was renamed Pakistan Railways. On 8 January 2016, the Lodhran–Raiwind Branch Line double-rail project was completed.

Structure

Pakistan Railways is a state-owned enterprise under the Ministry of Railways (MoR) of the government of Pakistan, tasked with and primarily responsible for planning, administrating and establishing passenger rail service and regulating railway companies and industries. Pakistan Railways policy and development are administered by the ministry. From 1947 to 1959, the Pakistan Western Railway and Pakistan Eastern Railway were administered by the Railway Division of the Ministry of Communications, headed by the Director General of Railways (DG Railways) in the ministry. In 1959, an ordinance was passed by Parliament outlining the need for a semi-autonomous railway board. The board was conceived in accordance with the principal powers of the central government as stipulated in the Railways Act IX of 1890. After the first session of the third national assembly, President Ayub Khan issued Presidential Order 33 on 9 June 1962. The order directed the transfer of control of both railways (PWR and PER) from the central government to the provincial governments of West Pakistan and East Pakistan, respectively. When PO 33 came into effect on 1 July 1962, railway boards were established by both provinces (repealing the Railway Board Ordinance of 1959).

The presidential order also reinstated the separation convention whereby railway finances were separated from general finances beginning with fiscal year 1961-62, giving each board greater autonomy. In 1974, the Ministry of Railways was created to administer planning, policy-making, technical advice and management of the railway. In 1982 the Ministry of Railways was merged with the Railway Board by a presidential order, resulting in the federal ministry.

Railway Board 
The Railway Board, in existence from 1959 to 2000, was modified with an executive committee from 2000 and 2014. The Railway Board was reconstituted on 20 February 2015. The Board members are:
 Federal Secretary Railways (Chairman of Board)
 Federal Secretary Communications 
 Finance Secretary of Pakistan
 Planning and Development Secretary of Pakistan
 General Manager Railways (Operations)
 General Manager Railways (Manufacturing and Services)
 Member Finance, Ministry of Railways

Units and divisions
Pakistan Railways has three functional units: operations, manufacturing and welfare and special initiatives. The operations unit is divided into three main departments. The Infrastructure Department oversees civil engineering, signaling, telecommunications, design and the directorate of property. The Mechanical Engineering Department oversees mechanical engineering, purchasing, stores and electrical engineering, and the Traffic Department oversees passenger facilities, operations, marketing and the directorate of information technology. Several smaller departments, including personnel, railway police, planning, legal affairs, public relations and the Pakistan Railways Academy, are also part of the operations unit. The railway has eight territorial operating divisions: Karachi, Lahore, Multan, Peshawar, Quetta, Rawalpindi, Sukkur and Gwadar. Gawadar Division is not yet operational. In addition to these 8 divisions, one division is non operating division which is Mughulpura Division, Lahore. This division is, primarily, engaged with maintenance of rolling stock.

Pakistan Railways Divisions
The Railways has 8 Regional Operating Divisions:

 Pakistan Railways Karachi Division
 Pakistan Railways Sukkur Division
 Pakistan Railways Multan Division
 Pakistan Railways Lahore Division
 Pakistan Railways Rawalpindi Division
 Pakistan Railways Peshawar Division
 Pakistan Railways Quetta Division
 Pakistan Railways Gwadar Division, -, it is not active yet

Rolling stock

Pakistan Railways has 190 working diesel-electric locomotives. The average life of the fleet is 25 years, and they are serviced at the Pakistan Locomotive Factory.

In January 2016, the railway ordered 800 hopper wagons from Jinan Railway Vehicles Equipment. The first 205 wagons will be built in China, and the remaining 595 wagons will be assembled at the Moghalpura Railway Workshops in Pakistan. The wagons will carry coal to power stations in Karachi and Qadirabad.

Manufacturing

The factory's capacity is 150 coaches per year on a single-shift basis.

The Moghalpura Railway Workshops, on the Lahore–Wagah Branch Line at Moghalpura Junction railway station (MGPR) in Lahore, are one of several rolling-stock repair sites. The workshop complex emerged at its present site in 1904 to manufacture, repair and overhaul passenger coaches and freight wagons for the North Western State Railway. In 1947, it was the only state-of-the-art workshop for Pakistan Railways.

The railway owns five concrete sleeper factories in Sukkur, Khanewal, Kohat, Shahinabad and Kotri. The first factory was established in Sukkur in 1967, and the other four factories were opened between 1979 and 1981.

Network

Lines
The Pakistan Railways network is divided into main lines and branch lines. The Karachi-Peshawar line is the main north-south line, and the Rohri-Chaman line is the main east-west line.

Main lines
 Main Line 1 (ML-1) Karachi–Peshawar Line
 Main Line 2 (ML-2) Kotri–Attock Line
 Main Line 3 (ML-3) Rohri–Chaman Line
 Main Line 4 (ML-4) Quetta–Taftan Line
 Main Line 5 (ML-5) Taxila–Khunjerab Line

Branch lines

Tracks

Pakistan Railways owns  of track.

The broad-gauge track axle load limit is 22.86 tonnes, except for the Rohri-Chaman Line (limit 17.78 tonnes) and Quetta-Taftan Line (limit 17.27 tonnes).

Electrification
The Lahore-Khanewal line was electrified at 25 kV AC, but electric service had ceased by 2011. The theft of overhead wire was cited as a reason.

Rail links with adjacent countries
Iran - Pakistan Railways is connected to the Islamic Republic of Iran Railways at Zahedan, where a break-of-gauge exists between the  Quetta–Taftan Railway Line and the  Kerman–Zahedan line. The link was completed on 18 May 2007.
Afghanistan - Presently there is no rail link to Afghanistan, but Pakistan Railways has proposed to help build an Afghan rail network in three phases. Phase one would stretch from the Chaman to Spin Boldak as an extension of the Rohri–Chaman Line. Phase two would extend the line from Spin Boldak to Kandahar. It is unknown where the break-of-gauge station would be. Another proposal would extend the Karachi-Peshawar Line to Kabul via Jalalabad.
Turkmenistan via Afghanistan – Proposed, avoiding the intervening  gauge
China - There is no present rail link with China.
Turkey - The completion of the Pakistan-Iran link has made it possible, in principle, to run trains between Pakistan and Turkey via Iran. A container train trial service was begun by Prime Minister Yousuf Raza Gilani between Islamabad and Istanbul on 14 August 2009. An Istanbul-Tehran-Islamabad passenger rail service has also been proposed. In 2009, Minister for Railways Ghulam Ahmad Bilour expressed the hope that after the container-train trial a passenger train would be introduced. There are also hopes that the route would link Europe and Central Asia and carry passengers.
India - Two rail links to India exist: the Thar Express from Jodhpur, Rajasthan to Karachi and the Samjhauta Express from Delhi to Lahore. The more rail links (including reopening) being proposed.
Russia - Proposed  Indian broad gauge corridors extension via Central Asia.

Service

Passenger service
Pakistan Railways carried 52.2 million passengers in 2016 and operates 28 mail, express and passenger trains. The railway carries a daily average of 178,000 people, and provides special trains for Eid ul Fitr, Eid ul Azha, Independence Day and Raiwind Ijtema. It set up a website during the early 2000s to provide travelers with up-to-date information about seat availability, departures and arrivals. Online ticket purchase was added to the website in 2016, with reservations confirmed by SMS. Wi-Fi service is included on the Green Line Express.

Classes
Pakistan Railways has several classes of travel. Depending on the route, some trains have one class. Fares for the classes vary, with unreserved seating the least expensive. The following table lists the classes and codes:

Current Minister Of Pakistan Railway 
Farrukh Taimuri is the CEO of Pakistan Railways, and Mr. Khwaja Saad Rafique is the present Minister (SR General Manager). Currently, it has 6 departments and 1 subsidiary.

Pakistan Railways Vision 2026, which was also introduced by the Ministry of Railways, promises to expand PR's percentage of Pakistan's transportation from 4% to 20%. This plan calls for brand-new developments, locomotives, and renovations. It is a significant and involved railroad organization member.

Freight service
Pakistan Railways was the predominant mode of freight transportation from coastal ports to the interior. At their peak, between 1955 and 1960, PR handled 73 percent of the country's freight traffic (compared to less than four percent in 2015). The Freight Business Unit operates over 200 freight stations, including the Port of Karachi and Bin Qasim Port, and several dry ports in Pakistan's four provinces. With 12,000 employees, the unit generates revenue from the movement of agricultural, industrial and imported products such as petroleum oil and lubricants, wheat, coal, fertilizer, rock phosphate, cement and sugar from the ports to the interior. On 14 August 2009, Prime Minister Yousuf Raza Gilani launched a freight train between Islamabad and Istanbul via Tehran. In 2015, freight carried by Pakistan Railways increased significantly to 3.3 million tons.

On February 22, 2020 the first cargo train bound for Afghanistan left Karachi, Pakistan with a load of containers. Pakistan Railways Chairman Habib-ur-Rehman Gilani inaugurated the train on Saturday which departed from the Pakistan International Container Terminal in Karachi with 35 containers on board for the country’s southwest Chaman city bordering Afghanistan. From there, the goods will be shifted across the border via road, the Nation reported

Heritage 

In Ghangha Pur, a  narrow gauge horse-drawn tramway is operational. It was first opened in 1898, closed in 1998, and re-opened in 2010.

The Khyber train safari is a steam operated train between Peshawar and Attock Khurd. It was first opened in 1925, suspended in 1982, reopened in 1996 as Khyber steam safari, suspended again in 2006 and finally reopened in 2015 with present name.

Accidents
Train accidents are common in Pakistan.

Sukkur rail disaster: Occurred on 4 January 1990 in the village of Sangi, near Sukkur in Sindh Province. In Pakistan's worst rail disaster, 307 people were killed. The Bahauddin Zakaria Express, on an  overnight run from Multan to Karachi, carried many more passengers in its 16 carriages than its 1,408-seat capacity. The train was supposed to pass through the village of Sangi, but incorrectly-set points sent it into a siding and it struck an empty 67-car freight train at a speed of at least .
 Ghotki rail crash: In PR's worst accident in recent years, three passenger trains collided on 13 July 2005. Thirteen carriages derailed, and over 120 people were killed. The Karachi Express struck the rear of the Quetta Express while it was stopped at a station near Ghotki, and the Tezgam (travelling in the opposite direction) struck several of the derailed carriages. According to officials, the conductor of the Karachi Express misread a signal.

 Super Parcel Express: On 21 August 2005, the upcountry Super Parcels Express derailed while crossing the Malir Bridge near Landhi in Karachi Division. Eight bogies were seriously damaged when an axle broke due to overloading, and rail traffic was suspended for 24 hours; all trains were terminated and turned around at Landhi.
 Mehrabpur derailment: The Karachi Express, from Karachi to Lahore, derailed near the town of Mehrabpur in Sindh on 19 December 2007. At about 2:25 a.m. local time, fourteen of the train's sixteen carriages left the tracks; some were mangled by the crash, and others slid down an embankment into water. Sabotage and terrorism were ruled out as reasons for the derailment, with officials blaming faulty track.
 2011 Bolan Mail Derail On July 29, 2011 Five bogies of the Bolan Mail were derailed while railway track of 300 feet was damaged as unidentified miscreants destroyed the track in Dera Allahyar area here on Friday. Police told the media that the incident happened at the Marri Farm when the train was going to Quetta from Karachi.
 2012 Bolan Mail Collide With Engine Nov 16, 2012 The driver of Bolan Mail was injured when the train accidentally collided with another engine near Kotri Railway Station on Friday morning. Bolan Mail had a clear signal to run on the up-track due to which it bumped into the already halted engine on the same track that was scheduled to travel to Karachi from Quetta.
 2015 Bolan Mail Derail June 17, 2015 On Five bogies of the Quetta-bound Bolan Mail derailed near Madeji due to cracks in a dyke of Dadu Canal on Tuesday. Several passengers were injured when the bogies of the train derailed near Madeji in Shikarpur district of Sindh due to cracks in embankment of Dadu Canal and the gushing out water weakened the rail track, making a hole beneath it, which resulted in the accident. The rescue teams rushed to the place of the incident and launched relief operations. They reached the area and started helping the passengers. DS Railways said five additional bogies had been attached with the Akbar Bugti Express for the victim passengers of Bolan Mail. He said the Railways provided alternative transport facility to the victims so as they could reach their destinations. He said the affected portion of the railway track could only be repaired when the breach in the dyke was repaired. He said eight passengers were injured in the incident.
 2015 Gujranwala derailment: On 2 July 2015, three carriages of a special train fell into a canal and another derailed near Gujranwala. Nineteen people were killed.
Twenty people were killed. 
 Karachi rail crash: The Bahauddin Zakaria Express collided with the Fareed Express (parked at the Landhi railway station) on 3 November 2016, killing 21 people.
 2017 Mehr Express Derailment On December 23, 2017 Multan-bound Mehr Express collided Friday night with a trailer truck carrying sugarcane produce here near the city's Shah Alam area, rescue officials said. At least four people — three passengers and the train driver — were injured during the accident, with an emergency medical aid team dispatched immediately. Peshawar-to-Karachi Khushhal Khan Khattak Express was delayed due to tracks being closed off after the collision.
 2018 Khushal Khan Khattak Express Derailment On September 17, 2018 Twenty-one passengers were injured when seven coaches as well as the locomotive of Peshawer-bound Khushal Khan Khattak Express Derailed in a hilly area between the Massan Railway Station and Sawan Bridge, about 45 km from here, on Sunday morning.Rescue 1122 said one of the 21 passengers was admitted to the Kalabagh tehsil headquarters hospital with critical injuries.A railways press release said 20 passengers were injured, with four of them admitted to the Mianwali DHQ hospital.
 2019 Nasirabad Rail Derailment  March 17, 2019 The railway track near Nasirabad was blown up and five bogies of Jaffar Express derailed killing at least five persons on Sunday.The train was going to Quetta. Eight persons sustained injuries in the incident. The rescue teams reached the spot and started shifting the victims to the hospital. The explosion damaged the railway track as well and the locomotion of other trains is also affected. The authorities have started interrogating the matter. The security personnel and police rounded up the area and started the investigation. Moreover, it has been learnt that railway officials are trying to reinstate the track as soon as possible. 
Sadiqabad rail crash (Walhaar): On 11 July 2019, Akbar Express hit a parked cargo train at the Walhaar Railway Station. 21 people were killed and 100 injured. Minister for Railways Sheikh Rashid Ahmad also expressed grief over the loss of precious lives caused by the accident. He announced compensation of Rs2 million for the families of the deceased and Rs1.5 million each for the injured.
Rahimyar Khan: On 31 October 2019 at least 75 people died after a fire broke out in Tezgam Express – travelling from Karachi to Rawalpindi – after a gas canister reportedly exploded on board as the train was passing through Rahim Yar Khan. The fire started after passengers started cooking on the train, and the resulting inferno destroyed three economy-class carriages of the train. A witness claimed that the fire could not be attributed to the gas cylinder blast since all the cylinders were emptied at the station. Many of the victims died when they jumped from the moving train to escape the inferno.
2020 Sheikhupura level crossing accident: On 3 July 2020, at least 20 people died and ten others were injured mostly members of the Pakistani Sikh community in Shah Hussain Express collided with a bus near Sachcha Sauda railway station in Sheikhupura District.
2020 Balochistan Train Accident Freight Train Collision Between 22 Wheeler Truck Between Wali Khan And Sheikh Wasil Railway Station Quetta Pakistan
2021 Ghotki rail crash: On 7 June 2021, at least 62 people died and 200 others were injured so far in a collision between Millat Express and Sir Syed Express.
2022 Jaffar Express At Bomb Blast Derailment  On Six passengers injured as bomb blast derails January 19, 2022 Pakistan Railways officials said that Jaffar Express left for Rawalpindi from Quetta and when it reached near Sibi a powerful bomb blast took place that derailed four carriages of the train.
2022 Bolan Mail Rail Crash : On 25 April 2022 Four injured as Bolan Mail collides with goods train in Balochistan. Levies sources said that Bolan Mail, which was on its way from Karachi to Quetta, collided with a goods train in Peeru Kunri Post area of Kachhi.According to them, three boogies of the train derailed from the track. The injured passengers were rushed to a nearby hospital for medical treatment.

Future

New lines
New rail lines have been proposed by Pakistan Railways to connect Gwadar Port to Central Asia, including:
 Karachi–Gwadar Railway Line (Makran Railway)
 Gwadar–Mastung Branch Line
 Basima–Jacobabad Branch Line
 Bostan–Zhob–Dera Ismail Khan Branch Line
 Islamabad–Muzaffarabad Branch Line
 Jhang Sadar–Risalewala Branch Line

Breaks of gauge
In Pakistan: – at Gwadar Port
Outside Pakistan: – at Mazar-i-Sharif, Afghanistan and – at Kashgar, China

Track-doubling project
Over  of tracks have been doubled since the track-doubling project began in the 1990s. Sections of the Karachi–Peshawar Line were first doubled, since it was the country's busiest and longest line.

Karachi–Peshawar Line
Kiamari–Lodhran Junction: 
Lodhran Junction–Sher Shah Junction: 
Sher Shah Junction–Multan Cantonment: 
Multan Cantonment–Khanewal Junction: 
Khanewal Junction–Sahiwal: 
Sahiwal–Okara: 
Bhoe Asal–Raiwind Junction: 
Raiwind Junction–Shahdara Bagh Junction: 
Chaklala–Golra Sharif Junction:

Rohri–Chaman Line
Aab-e-Gum–Kolpur: 
Gulistan–Chaman:

Lahore–Wagah branch line
Lahore Junction–Wagah:

Restructuring
In March 2010, the Pakistani government announced plans to privatise Pakistan Railways and split it into four businesses focusing on passenger operations, freight, infrastructure and manufacturing. In February 2010, "Unbundling" was proposed the previous month, with activities being outsourced, privatised, or operated separately. However, complete privatisation has been ruled out.

Public-private partnership
Pakistan Railways has faced financial and management crisis, and has met with private operators. Several trains are a public-private partnership. The Pakistan Business Express Train made its first run on 3 February 2012, and the Shalimar Express resumed operation on 25 February of that year.

China-Pakistan Economic Corridor

China is involved in the development of Pakistan Railways, and has been increasing its stake in Pakistan's communications sector. Freight and passenger service make up 50 percent of the railway's total revenue. Pakistan Railways carries 65 million passengers annually and operates 228 mail, express and passenger trains daily. It introduced new mail and express trains between major terminals from 2003 to 2005. The railway has entered developmental agreements with Chinese rail companies. In 2001, Pakistan Railways signed a $91.89 million contract with China National Machinery Import and Export Corporation to manufacture 175 high-speed passenger coaches. The project was funded by Exim Bank of China on a supplier-credit basis. Forty passenger coaches have been received, and 105 were scheduled to be assembled in Pakistan Railways' carriage factory. The coaches are in use on Pakistan Railways' Rawalpindi-Lahore-Karachi, Lahore-Faisalabad and Rawalpindi-Quetta mail and express trains. The manufacturing kits for the remaining 30 coaches have been received, and 12 are assembled. The technology transfer for the coaches was obtained from China's Chang Chun Car Company.

Pakistan Railways purchased 69 locomotives, 15 of which are in use by the railway, as part of a 2003 agreement with China. The remaining 54 are scheduled to be built at Pakistan Railways' locomotive factory. The Chinese locomotives are 37 percent less expensive than European locomotives. Although some Pakistani observers have criticised faulty locomotives purchased by Pakistan Railways from Dongfang Electric of China, the railway decided to purchase 45 more 2,000-3,000-horsepower locomotives from Dongfang. The company is willing to redesign the 30 delivered locomotives, strengthening their underframes and reducing their weight below 140 tons each. The Beijing Research and Design Institute is committed to provide 300 rail cars to Pakistan Railways.

According to a 2004 agreement with China National Machinery and Equipment Group, the Chinese company would begin the construction of Corridor 1 of a light-rail mass-transit system in Karachi which is intended to serve four million commuters. The project, costing about $568 million, would take four-and-a-half years to complete. The contract, awarded on a build–operate–transfer basis, consists of five corridors. Pakistan signed a series of agreements with China to expand the capability of its railway system. Under an agreement with China Railway, a Chinese company would provide 1,300 freight cars to Pakistan Railways; 420 would be manufactured in China, and the remaining 880 would be produced at the Moghalpura Railway Workshops in Lahore. In another project, 450 passenger coaches would be rehabilitated at an estimated cost of Rs2.14 billion. This would include air-conditioning 40 coaches, converting 10 power vans and providing 100 high-speed bogies; 30 would be imported from China, and 70 would be manufactured domestically on a transfer-of-technology basis. In a separate agreement, 175 new passenger coaches are being purchased from China.

As part of a $100 million agreement signed by Pakistan and China in November 2001, China is to export 69 locomotives to Pakistan to modernize the country's rail fleet. The new engines consume less fuel than older models, and cost less to maintain. The first 15 engines would be manufactured in China, and the remainder would be assembled in Pakistan with Chinese parts and technology. For a Rs7.2 billion project Sindh laying 78,000 tons of rails, China delivered 64,000 tons to Pakistan Railways.

Main Railway Line-1 (ML-1)

The ML-1 railway line project is one of the biggest projects not only of CPEC Phase-II ($6.8 billion) but of Pakistan’s recent history in terms of logistics and communications. Since the partition of British Indian Empire into India and Pakistan this is the single biggest expansion of railway system. It spans a total distance of 1,872 km from Karachi to Peshawar. It covers 184 railway stations and carries over 75% of country's cargo and passengers.

This will be a kind of revolution in terms of communications and industry. After being upgraded, the railway line will be installed with a computer-based signaling and control system – reducing the epidemic of railway accidents that has been seen across Pakistan. It follows all the international safety procedures and protocols to ensure safe operations of Pakistan Railway.

Karakoram Railway
Pakistan awarded a Rs72 million (US$1.2 million) contract to an international consortium to conduct a feasibility study for establishing a rail link with China to improve trade between the countries. The study will cover a  section between Havellian and the  Khunjerab Pass over Mansehra District and the Karakoram Highway. By expanding its stake in Pakistan's rail sector, China can utilise the country's advantageous geographic position at the confluence of South, Central and West Asia. During the first week of February 2007, Pakistan Railways and Dongfang Electric signed an agreement to establish a rail link between Havellian and Khunjerab. The route from Havellian and Khunjerab will probably include tunnels. The pre-feasibility study was completed in July 2011.

Gwadar link
As part of the development plan for its transport and communications network, Pakistan Railways has completed a feasibility study of the Chaman-Kandahar section for laying track between Pakistan and Turkmenistan through Afghanistan. A feasibility study for cost, engineering and design for the construction of a rail link from Gwadar to the existing rail network in Mastung district in Balochistan has been finalised. The link to the port of Gwadar will open underdeveloped areas of Balochistan to development. The chief aim of the venture is to connect the Central Asian republics with Pakistan Railways' network through Afghanistan.

China will benefit from Gwadar's accessible international trade routes to the Central Asian republics and China's Xinjiang border region. By extending its east-west railway from the Chinese border city of Kashgar to Peshawar in Pakistan's northwest, Beijing can trade freight to and from Gwadar along the shortest route (from Karachi to Peshawar). Pakistan's rail network could also supply oil from the Persian Gulf to Xinjiang and give China rail access to Iran.

Pakistan Railways has signed an agreement with two Chinese companies to launch a new app called Railway Automated Booking and Travel Assistance (RABTA). The app aims to provide passengers with a convenient way to manage their tickets, seats, booking, food, hotel and taxi-related matters. The minister for Railways views the initiative as a win-win situation for the department, as the app will also help maintain its income record.

See also

 List of railway stations in Pakistan
 Railway lines in Pakistan
 List of named passenger trains of Pakistan
 Transport in Pakistan

References

External links

 Official website of Pakistan Railways 
 Pakistan Ministry of Railways

 
Railway companies of Pakistan
Railway companies established in 1861
Pakistan federal departments and agencies
Government-owned companies of Pakistan
Companies based in Lahore
Pakistani brands
Pakistani companies established in 1947
Indian companies established in 1861
Railway companies established in 1947
Government-owned railway companies